The governor of Mountain Province is the local chief executive and head of the Provincial Government of Mountain Province in the Philippines.

List of governors of Mountain Province

References

Governors of Mountain Province
Governors of provinces of the Philippines